The 1971 Giro d'Italia was the 54th edition of the Giro d'Italia, one of cycling's Grand Tours. The field consisted of 100 riders, and 75 riders finished the race.

By rider

By nationality

References

1971 Giro d'Italia
1971